























Lists of country codes